Haft Shahidan (also Romanized as Haft Shahīdān; also known as Haft Tanūn, Pīr Gāh, Pīrgāh-e Haft Shāhedan, Pīrgāh-i-Haft Shahīdān, and Pīrqā) is a village in Jahangiri Rural District, in the Central District of Masjed Soleyman County, Khuzestan Province, Iran. At the 2006 census, its population was 395, in 69 families.

References 

Populated places in Masjed Soleyman County